Paul Newman (born 1937) is an American linguist active in the study of African languages. He writes on the Hausa language of Nigeria and on the Chadic language family. He wrote the Modern Hausa-English Dictionary (1977), co-authored with his wife, Roxana Ma Newman, and The Hausa Language: An Encyclopedic Reference Grammar (2000). He is the founder of the Journal of African Languages and Linguistics, a journal in the field of African-language studies.

He has taught at Yale University, the University of Leiden, and the Centre for the Study of Nigerian Languages at Bayero University in Kano, Nigeria. He is currently Distinguished Professor in the Department of Linguistics at Indiana University after serving two terms as chairman of the department.

Newman is a strong advocate of the theories of his mentor, Joseph Greenberg, and has published a work in defense of Greenberg's classification of African languages entitled On Being Right.

Newman is also interested in the relation of language and law and is a strong advocate of civil liberties. In addition to degrees in anthropology and linguistics he holds a JD (IU Bloomington, 2003) and is a member of the Indiana state bar.

Selected works 
1977. With Roxana Ma Newman. Modern Hausa-English Dictionary / Sabon Kamus Na Hausa Zuwa Turanci. Ibadan, Nigeria: Oxford University Press. 
1980. The Classification of Chadic within Afroasiatic. Leiden: Universitaire Pers Leiden. 
1990. Nominal and Verbal Plurality in Chadic. Dordrecht: Foris. 
1995. On Being Right: Greenberg’s African Linguistic Classification and the Methodological Principles Which Underlie It. Bloomington: Institute for the Study of Nigerian Languages and Cultures, African Studies Program, Indiana University. 
2000. The Hausa Language: An Encyclopedic Reference Grammar. New Haven: Yale University Press. 
2001. With Martha Ratliff (editors). Linguistic Fieldwork. Cambridge: Cambridge University Press. 
2002. Chadic and Hausa Linguistics: Selected Papers of Paul Newman, with Commentaries, edited by Philip J. Jaggar and H. Ekkehard Wolff. Köln: Rudiger Köppe Verlag. 
2004. Klingenheben’s Law in Hausa. Köln: Rudiger Köppe Verlag.
2007. A Hausa-English Dictionary. New Haven: Yale University Press.

References

External links
Biography on Indiana University website 
Interview with Paul Newman by Alan S. Kaye from Semiotica

1937 births
Living people
People from Jacksonville, Florida
University of Pennsylvania School of Arts and Sciences alumni
Linguists from the United States
Yale University faculty
Academic staff of Leiden University
Indiana University faculty
American Africanists
Linguists of Hausa
American expatriates in Nigeria
Academic staff of Bayero University Kano
American expatriates in the Netherlands
University of California, Los Angeles alumni
Indiana University Maurer School of Law alumni
Linguists of Afroasiatic languages
Paleolinguists
Linguists of Chadic languages